Robert Maitland may refer to:
 Robert Maitland (rugby union) (fl. 1881–1885), Scottish rugby union player
 Bob Maitland  (1924–2010), British racing cyclist
 Robert Maitland (water polo) (born 1983), Australian water polo player

See also

 Robert Maitland Brereton (1834–1911), English railway engineer
 Robert Maitland O'Reilly (1845–1912), 20th Surgeon General of the United States Army